The Redfern Gallery is an exhibition space in the West End of London specialising in contemporary British art. It was founded by Arthur Knyvett-Lee and Anthony Maxtone Graham in 1923 as an artists' cooperative on the top floor of Redfern House, 27 Old Bond Street, and in 1936 moved to nearby 20 Cork Street.

Early exhibitions
In 1924 it showed the student work of Henry Moore and Barbara Hepworth, and in 1929, the first exhibition of British linocuts featuring work by Cyril Edward Power, Sybil Andrews, and Claude Flight.

Recent exhibitions

In early 2014, the gallery held a retrospective of British pop art artist Brian Rice. In 2015–2016 it showed work by Sarah Armstrong-Jones.

References

Further reading
The Redfern Gallery - Artists and Friends: Photographs by Karin Székessy. Mark Glazebrook & Karin Székessy,  The Redfern Gallery, London, 2006. 

1923 establishments in the United Kingdom
Art galleries established in 1923
Contemporary art galleries in London